Dirt Rally 2.0 (stylised as DiRT Rally 2.0) is a racing simulation video game developed and published by Codemasters for PlayStation 4, Windows, and Xbox One. It was released on 26 February 2019. A version for Amazon Luna followed on 3 June 2021. It is a successor to the 2015 video game Dirt Rally and emphasises realistic driving physics.

Gameplay 
Dirt Rally 2.0 is focused on rallying and rallycross. Players compete in timed stage events on tarmac and off-road terrain in varying weather conditions. The game features stages in Argentina, Australia, New Zealand, Poland, Spain and the United States. Codemasters also announced plans to expand the game through the release of downloadable content, and released stages in Finland, Germany, Greece, Monte Carlo, Sweden and Wales. These stages are remastered versions of the stages included in the original Dirt Rally. There is also a rallycross mode with World RallyCross Supercars (including the lineup of the 2018 season) and eight circuits from the FIA World Rallycross Championship. Dirt Rally 2.0 lets players choose between a total of fifty cars, including the aforementioned World Rallycross Supercars, historic rally cars from the 1960s through the 1980s, Groups A, B and R rally cars, and modern rally cars from the 1990s to the late 2010s. This was later expanded to thirteen locations through downloadable content. Every car can have its setup adjusted before a race.

The game also features a new weather modelling system where changes in the weather affect the relative level of grip and require players to take a more nuanced approach to driving. The weather also affects visibility in stages. The surface of the stages is also subject to degradation; as more cars pass over a stage, more than 100 layers ensure that the road surface will start to shift and break up, affecting grip levels. The gameplay therefore demands maximum concentration, especially as some stages can take more than ten minutes to complete. There is no rewind function and damages not only have a visual but also mechanical effect, with it being possible to sustain "terminal damage", which automatically ends whatever race the car is in as a DNF.

The "My Team" mode introduced in Dirt 4 is expanded upon, requiring players to hire specialist engineers to maintain the car. However, other elements such as customising liveries, signing sponsors and expanding team facilities were removed. Damage sustained during a rally carries over from event to event. Players are also able to make a wider range of strategic choices, such as tyre compounds; softer tyres offer more grip but wear out faster, while harder tyres are more durable but produce slower stage times. Codemasters later introduced a more comprehensive tutorial for setting up the car to make the process more accessible for newcomers, amateurs and players who have been deterred from exploring setup options in the past.

The release of downloadable content follows a fortnightly schedule, and includes the return of rally locations from the first game, as well as cars such as the Škoda Fabia and BMW M1. The final DLC package is titled "Colin McRae: Flat Out". It features a new location in Perth and Kinross in Scotland, cars driven by Colin McRae and a scenario mode where players re-enact moments from McRae's career.

Development
Dirt Rally 2.0 is the first game in the series to be developed by Codemasters after game director Paul Coleman's departure from the company in early 2018. Rally drivers Ryan Champion and Jon Armstrong served as consultants throughout the game's development with occasional help from Oliver Solberg, while veteran co-driver Phil Mills lent his voice as the game's English-speaking co-driver. Neil Cole is the English-speaking voice of the rallycross spotter. As with other Codemasters racing games, audio was meticulously recorded from inside and out of each car in the game, capturing isolated tracks of intake, exhaust, turbo/superchargers, transmission, and cabin noise.

Reception

Dirt Rally 2.0 received "generally favorable reviews", according to review aggregator Metacritic.

Awards

References

External links
 

Racing simulators
Rally racing video games
Codemasters games
Colin McRae Rally and Dirt series
Ego (game engine) games
Multiplayer and single-player video games
Oculus Rift games
PlayStation 4 games
2019 video games
Video games set in New Zealand
Video games set in Argentina
Video games set in Finland
Video games set in Germany
Video games set in Greece
Video games set in Monaco
Video games set in Spain
Video games set in Scotland
Video games set in Sweden
Video games set in Poland
Video games set in Portugal
Video games set in Australia
Video games set in New England
Video games set in Wales
Windows games
Xbox One games
Video games developed in the United Kingdom